Max Rostal (7 July 1905 – 6 August 1991) was a violinist and a viola player. He was Austrian-born, but later took British citizenship.

Biography
Max Rostal was born in Cieszyn to a Jewish merchant family. As a child prodigy, he started studying the violin at the age of 5, and played in front of Emperor Franz Josef I in 1913.

He studied with Carl Flesch. He also studied theory and composition with Emil Bohnke and Matyás Seiber. He won the Mendelssohn Scholarship in 1925. In 1930–33 he taught at the Berlin Hochschule, from 1944 to 1958 at the Guildhall School of Music, and then at the Musikhochschule Köln (1957–82) and the Conservatory in Bern (1957–85). His pupils included Maria Vischnia, Yfrah Neaman, Paulo Bosísio, Howard Leyton-Brown, Igor Ozim, Ole Bohn, Peggy Klinger, Paul Rozeck, Edith Peinemann, Bryan Fairfax and members of the Amadeus Quartet. In 1945, in honour of Flesch, he co-founded what was later known as the Carl Flesch International Violin Competition with Edric Cundell.

Rostal played a wide variety of music, but was a particular champion of contemporary works such as Béla Bartók's Violin Concerto No. 2. He made a number of recordings. Rostal premiered Alan Bush's Violin Concerto of 1946–8 in 1949. He was the dedicatee of Benjamin Frankel's first solo violin sonata (1942), and he also made the premiere recording. He commissioned the violin concerto by Bernard Stevens in 1943.

Rostal played in a piano trio with Heinz Schröter (piano) and Gaspar Cassadó (cello), who was replaced in 1967 by Siegfried Palm. He edited a number of works for Schott Music, and also produced piano reductions.

Rostal's daughter Sybil B. G. Eysenck became a psychologist and is the widow of the personality psychologist Hans Eysenck, with whom she collaborated. Rostal died in Bern.

Discography
Benjamin Frankel: Sonata No. 1 for solo violin, Op. 13 (1942) on Decca K 1178 
Frederick Delius: Violin Sonata No. 2, Sir Edward Elgar: Violin Sonata, and Sir William Walton: Violin Sonata (1954 recordings, released 1955-7 on LP on Westminster), reissued on the Testament UK  label, SBT1319 (2003). 
Maurice Ravel: Sonate fur Violine und Klavier, Marcel Mihalovici: 2.Sonate fur Violine und Klavier op.45 Deutsche Grammophon SLPM 138 016, 1959.
Violin concertos by Béla Bartók (No. 2), Alban Berg, Bernard Stevens, and Dmitri Shostakovich (No. 1) recorded between 1948 and 1962, released on CD on Symposium Records, UK 
Franz Schubert: Fantasie in C major, D.934, Robert Schumann: Sonata A minor, Op. 105, Claude Debussy: Sonata, Igor Stravinsky: Duo Concertant, Symposium Records, UK
Johann Sebastian Bach: Sonata in E minor (arranged by Howard Ferguson), Heinrich Ignaz Franz von Biber: Passacaglia, Giuseppe Tartini: Concerto in G minor, Sonata The Devil's Trill, Ludwig van Beethoven: Romances No. 1 and 2, Symposium Records, UK
Franz Schubert: 3 Sonatas, Op. 137, No. 1-3, Rondo in B minor, Op. 70, D. 895, Sonata in A major, Op. 162, D. 574, Symposium Records, UK

Media
 European Archive Copyright free LP recording of Beethoven's Kreutzer sonata by Max Rostal (violin) and Franz Osborn (piano) at the European Archive (for non-American viewers only).

Bibliography

Books

Rostal, Max, Ludwig van Beethoven: Die Sonaten für Violine und Klavier, Gedanken zu ihrer Interpretation, Mit einem Nachtrag aus pianistischer Sicht von Günter Ludwig, R.Piper & Co. Verlag, Munich, 1981
Rostal, Max, Handbuch zum Geigenspiel, unter Mitarbeit von Berta Volmer, Müller & Schade publishing house, Bern, 1993
Rostal, Max, Violin – Schlüssel – Erlebnisse, Erinnerungen, Mit einem autobiografischen Text von Leo Rostal, Ries & Erler, Berlin, 2007

Editions
Heinrich Ignaz Franz von Biber: Passacaglia für Violine allein, London 1951, Bern 1984
Johann Sebastian Bach: Sonaten und Partiten, Leipzig 1982
Wolfgang Amadeus Mozart: Violinkonzert KV 218, Mainz 1967
Wolfgang Amadeus Mozart: Violinkonzert KV 219, Mainz 1961
Wolfgang Amadeus Mozart: Adagio KV 261, Mainz 1964
Wolfgang Amadeus Mozart: Rondo KV 373, Mainz 1975
Ludwig van Beethoven: Sonaten, München 1978
Ludwig van Beethoven: Romanzen Nr. 1 and 2, Mainz
Ludwig van Beethoven: Violinkonzert, Mainz 1971
Franz Schubert: Rondo A-dur, Mainz 1964
Peter Tchaikowsky: Konzert für Violine und Orchester, Mainz 1973
Carl Maria von Weber: Rondo Brillant op. 62, Berlin 1930/1985
Carl Flesch: Das Skalensystem, Berlin 1987
Jacob Dont: Etüden und Capricen op. 35, Mainz 1971
Pierre Rode: 24 Capricen, Mainz 1974
Henryk Wieniawski: L'École moderne op. 10, Bern 1991

Compositions
Max Rostal: Studie in Quinten, für Violine mit Klavierbegleitung, 1955
Max Rostal: Studie in Quarten, für Violine mit Klavierbegleitung, 1957

References

See also 
 List of émigré composers in Britain

1905 births
1991 deaths
20th-century Austrian people
20th-century violinists
Austrian emigrants to the United Kingdom
Austrian violinists
British violinists
British male violinists
Mendelssohn Prize winners
British people of Austrian-Jewish descent
British Jews
Silesian Jews
Austrian Jews
People from Austrian Silesia
People from Cieszyn
Academic staff of the Hochschule für Musik und Tanz Köln
20th-century British musicians
Naturalised citizens of the United Kingdom
Recipients of the Order of Merit of the Federal Republic of Germany
20th-century British male musicians